Hans-Jörg Holubitschka (born 29 July 1960 in Seltzer, Westerwald) - 16 December 2016 Düsseldorf) was a German painter. He studied at the Kunstakademie Düsseldorf. Holubitschka lived and worked in Düsseldorf. At the Ruhrakademie in Schwerte he taught the subject painting.

Life 
After leaving school, Hans-Jörg Holubitschka went on the recommendation of his former art teacher at the high school to Düsseldorf to study from 1980 to 1988 at the Kunstakademie Düsseldorf in the class of Gerhard Richter. There he met other students, for example his fellow painter Thomas Bernstein.  Other later fellow artists with whom he already be friends during the Academy times, as Stefan Demary, Heinz Hausmann, Bernard Lokai and more accompanied him on his other artistic projects.

Work 
After finishing his studies, Hans-Jörg Holubitschka devoted to the landscape painting. His favorite subjects are landscapes views among others in southern France, Italy, England with Scotland, Ireland, Spain, landscapes in Germany including his native Westerwald, but also the Swiss Alps and the Bavarian Alps. The "Urban Landscapes" and cityscapes, he has painted, include the following cities: Düsseldorf, Rio de Janeiro, London, Paris, Orvieto, Mallorca, Rome and Venice. Since the year 2012, he also dealt with the theme of cultural landscape. For this purpose, it is one of the artificially designed landscapes, such as golf course landscapes. He has implemented picturesque new visual landscapes of the following places: The Fifteens (Düsseldorf Golf Club), The Seventh (Hubbelrath Golf Club), Princeville Hawaii, St Andrews Scotland, Oubaai (South Africa) and Les Dunes United States.

Hans-Jörg Holubitschka did not paint the representational quality of a landscape. The landscape was the medium for him to give the viewer a familiar motif access to its "soul pictures". He made use of color and its composition possibilities as an instrument to mental states to express. His images reflect in their color effects and excesses of the painter of the American Color Field painting like Mark Rothko, Barnet Newman or Clyfford Still. While these painters moved in perfect abstract space, it took Hans-Jörg Holubutischka, figurative elements of the landscape into abstract color fields to convert.

Exhibitions 
 1990 Gallery Tabea Langenkamp, Duesseldorf 
 1995 Municipal Museum Haus Koekkoek, Kleve
 1995 Gallery Schoettle, Munich 
 1996 Galerie Johnen & Schoettle, Cologne 
 1996 "Pintura", Castello di Rivara, Turin, Italy
 1996 En Helvetes förvandling Engelsk-fran NRW, Stockholm, Sweden
 1997 A different view, Andrew Mummery Gallery, London, Great Britain
 1998 New German Painters, Martin Leyer-Pritzkow Exhibitions, Decoplage, Miami, United States of America
 1998 Due Dimensioni, Accademia di Belle Arti di Venezia, Venice, Italy
 1999 Andrew Mummery Gallery, London, Great britain
 2000 Informal landscapes - scenic Informal, Martin Leyer-Pritzkow Ausstellungen, Duesseldorf, Germany
 2000 Due Dimensioni, pescheria Nuevo, Rovigo, Italy
 2001 Young Figuratives, including Armin Baumgarten, Peter Lindenberg, Olibver Loachau, Bernard Lokai, Stefan Müller, Katrin Roeber, Ketterer Kunst in Carolinen Palais, Munich, Germany.
 2002 Artax art trade - Ralph Kleinsimlinghaus, Düsseldorf, Germany
 2002 Young Figuratives, including Armin Baumgarten, Peter Lindenberg, Olibver Loachau, Bernard Lokai, Stefan Müller, Katrin Roeber, Mönchehaus - Museum of Modern Art, Goslar, Germany
 2002 Dispute of the painters, with Armin Baumgarten, Hans-Jörg Holubitschka, Bernard Lokai, Peter Lindenberg, Stefan Müller, Katrin Roeber, Martin Leyer-Pritzkow Ausstellungen, Düsseldorf, Germany
 2003 visions of landscape, gallery Schmalfuß, Marburg, Germany
 2003 new positions painting gallery Wittenbrink, Munich, Germany 
 2004 Kunstverein Arnsberg, Arnsberg, Germany
 2004 Kunstverein Ulm, Jost Münster, Germany
 2005 Gallery CP, Wiesbaden, Germany
 2008 Gallery Wittenbrink, Munich; Germany
 2009 Gallery CP, Wiesbaden, Germany
 2010 "carom"; Gallery Fellner of Feldegg, Krefeld, Germany 
 2012 New landscapes, Düsseldorf Golf Club, Düsseldorf, Germany
 2013 Gallery of Fellnegg Fellner, with Bernard Lokai, Krefeld, Germany
 2014 "4 auf 8" with Armin Baumgarten, Bernard Lokai and Katrin Roeber, Martin Leyer-Pritzkow Ausstellungen, Düsseldorf
 2014 "Forbidden Colours", Martin Leyer-Pritzkow Aussstellungen, Düsseldorf
 2014 Hans-Jörg Holubitschka, Gallery Wittenbrink, Munich
 2016 "Olympic Landscapes", Martin Leyer-Pritzkow, Düsseldorf

Literature 
 (Ed.) Martin Leyer-Pritzkow: Junge Figurative (Young Figuratives) : Robert Ketterer [prolog], with contribution of Martin Leyer-Pritzkow, Christoph Zuschlag, Düsseldorf, 50 with artists: Woytek Berowski; Hans-Jörg Holubitschka; Peter Lindenberg; Oliver Lochau; Bernard Lokai; Stefan Müller; Benjamin Nachtwey; Katrin Roeber, in English and German language, 2001, 
 Das Kunstkaufbuch  (the Art Purchase Book.): für Sammler und solche, die es werden wollen, (for collectors and others want to be), authors: Martin Leyer-Pritzkow, Klaus Sebastian. Artists: Thomas Schütte; Santiaogo Sierra; Horst Wackerbarth; Paola Pivi; Hans-Jörg Holubitschka; Musa, Hassan; ...- München; u.a. : Prestel., 63 p.: numerous coloured images,  

References 

 1992 "The near and the distant," Heinz-Norbert Jocks, Cologne sketches, Issue 2 
 1993 "Fond of landscapes," Heinz-Norbert Jocks, Düsseldorf booklets 10 
 1993 'gallery Tabea Langenkamp, "Heinz-Norbert Jocks, Art Forum" Vol 124 
 1994 'cycle of growth and decay, "ART 5"
 1994 "Becoming and Decaying in nature," Michael Tesch, Solinger Morgenpost, Issue 18 June 1994 
 1994 'turbulent nature rules, "Klaus Sebastian, Rheinische Post", 1 April 1994 
 1995 "Beyond the city or Essay on Landscape Painting", Heinz-Norbert Jocks, Art Forum Vol 130/1995, pp. 225 
 1997 "A different view", Time Out, London, Vol 3 
 1997 "The sky above the cities," Heinz-Norbert Jocks, Art Forum Vol 137 
 2000 "In the wake of the painted landscape," Bertram Müller, Rheinische Post 7 November 2000 
 2002 "Wonderful Worlds ..." Klaus Sebastian, Rheinische Post, 8 November 2002 
 2004 "object painting", Ralf Heese, New Ulm newspaper, 19 June 2004 
 2004 "The eyes do not dare," Petra Kollros, Südwestpresse 16 June 2004 
 2004 "key motive Matterhorn: Hans-Jörg Holubitschka" Dorothee Baer-archers, Art Newspaper No. 96, 8/2004 
 2005 "flirtation with kitsch motifs", Wiesbaden Kurier, 3/2005 
 2005 "The colors of Urbino," Nimbus. Art and Books AG, Zurich, Switzerland
 2004 Wellness on shaky hill, in the studio of the Düsseldorf artist, Interview by Ulrike Knöfel, Der Spiegel, 51/2004 
 2005 (Das Kunstkaufbuch) The Art Purchase Book, pp. 48 ff, Prestel-Verlag 
 2012 Hans-Jörg Holubitschka, judges, students and its golf landscapes, Uschi Beer, Golf in the Lower Rhine, Issue 2/2012 
 2012 The art of good financial investment, Katrin Gotthold and Daniel Eckert, in Die Welt, Issue 11 November 2012

External links 

 Literature from and about Hans-Jörg Holubitschka in the German National Library
 Literature from and about Hans-Jörg Holubitschka in the online-library of the art collection of North Rhine-Westphalia.
 Art works from Hans-Jörg Holubitschka at Martin Leyer-Pritzkow

Video 
 Interview from Martin Leyer-Pritzkow with Hans-Jörg Holubitschka in his art studio, autumn 2014 (German language)

1960 births
20th-century German painters
20th-century German male artists
German male painters
21st-century German painters
21st-century German male artists
Kunstakademie Düsseldorf alumni
Artists from Düsseldorf
2016 deaths